John Daly may refer to:

Entertainment
 John Charles Daly (1914–1991), American radio and television newsman and host of the TV panel game show What's My Line?
 John Daly (producer) (1937–2008), British movie producer and director of The Big Bang
 John Daly (Irish TV presenter), Northern Irish chat show host

Politics
 John Corry Wilson Daly (1796–1878), first mayor of Stratford, Ontario
 John Daly (Irish Member of Parliament) (1834–1888), Irish Nationalist Member of Parliament for Cork City
 John Daly (Fenian) (1845–1916), Irish revolutionary and member of the Irish Republican Brotherhood
 John Daly (Irish politician) (1867–1932), represented Cork in the 1920s
 John Daly (Australian politician) (1891–1942), Australian lawyer and politician
 J. Burrwood Daly (John Burrwood Daly, 1872–1939), U.S. Representative from Pennsylvania
 John B. Daly (New York politician) (1929–1999), New York politician

Sports
 John Daly (footballer, born 1870) (1870–1913), South Australian Hall of Fame footballer
 John Daly (runner) (1880–1969), Irish athlete who won an Olympic silver medal
 John Daly (footballer, born 1890) (1890–1968), Australian footballer for Melbourne
 John Daly (rugby) (1917–1988), Irish rugby union and rugby league footballer of the 1940s and 1950s
 John Daly (swimmer) (born 1956), Puerto Rican former swimmer
 John Daly (golfer) (born 1966), professional golfer
 John Daly (skeleton racer) (born 1985), American skeleton racer
 John Daly (soccer coach), English American college soccer coach
 John Fintan Daly, Irish Gaelic football coach and player
 John Daly (Gaelic footballer), Irish footballer for Galway

Other
 John Daly (gambler) (1838–1906), New York City criminal
 John Daly (outlaw) (1839–1864), American Western outlaw
 John Donald Daly (1841–1923), American businessman and landowner, for whom Daly City, California, is named
 John Daly (bishop) (1901–1985), colonial Anglican bishop
 John W. Daly (1933–2008), American biochemist
 John Daly (academic) (1936–2018), Australian academic, sports historian, and athletics coach
 John Lawrence Daly (1943–2004), self-declared "Greenhouse skeptic"
 John Daly (trade unionist) (1930–1999), British trade union leader
 John Daly (American media personality, born 1955), 1990s American journalist
 John Daly, gang member in the 1963 robbery of a Royal Mail train
 John Daly (cocktail), an alcoholic mixed drink, named after American golfer John Daly

See also
 John Daley (disambiguation)
 John Dailey (disambiguation)
 Jon Daly (footballer) (born 1983), retired Irish footballer
 Jon Daly, American actor and comedian